James A. Higgins (c.1889 – November 26, 1962) was an American lawyer and politician from New York.

Life
He was born in Brooklyn, the son of Thomas Louis Higgins and Mary Scott Higgins. He graduated from Erasmus Hall High School and Fordham University School of Law. He was admitted to the bar in 1916.

Higgins was a member of the New York State Senate (6th D.) from 1923 to 1926, sitting in the 146th, 147th, 148th and 149th New York State Legislatures; and was Chairman of the Committee on Privileges and Elections from 1923 to 1924.

In 1926, he married Frances Heaviside, a niece of Gov. Al Smith, and they had three children.

He was New York City Commissioner of Accounts, appointed by Mayor Jimmy Walker, from 1927 to 1932.

He died on November 26, 1962; and was buried at St. John Cemetery in Queens.

New York Times: LOOT HIGGINS'S HOME OF $2,500 IN JEWELRY; Burglars Take Gems Beside Sleeping Child as CommissionerTakes Hour's Stroll. 
Beside Sleeping Child as Commissioner Takes Hour's Stroll. The home of James A. Higgins, Commissioner of Accounts, at 925 Union Street, Brooklyn, was entered Thursday night by a burglar or burglars, who stole aApril 28, 1928 -  - Print Headline: "LOOT HIGGINS'S HOME OF $2,500 IN JEWELRY; Burglars Take Gems Beside Sleeping Child as CommissionerTakes Hour's Stroll."

Sources
 New York Red Book (1925; pg. 67)
 WARREN IS CHOSEN FOR POLICE HEAD; HIS POST TO HIGGINS in NYT on April 1, 1927 (subscription required)
 JAMES A. HIGGINS, EX-CITY AIDE, DIES in NYT on November 28, 1962 (subscription required)
 Higgins family at GenForum

1880s births
1962 deaths
Politicians from Brooklyn
Democratic Party New York (state) state senators
Erasmus Hall High School alumni
Fordham University School of Law alumni
20th-century American politicians